Paya Lebar Single Member Constituency was a constituency in Singapore. 

It used to exist from 1955 to 1988 as Paya Lebar Constituency and was renamed as Paya Lebar Single Member Constituency (SMC) as part of Singapore's political reforms. The SMC was merged into Aljunied Group Representation Constituency in 1997.

Member of Parliament

Elections

Elections in the 1950s

Elections in the 1960s

Elections in the 1970s

Elections in the 1980s

Historical maps

References

Singaporean electoral divisions
Hougang